Henry Hall (1734–1815) was Archdeacon of Dorset from 1801  until his death on 29 May 1815.

Hall was educated at St John's College, Oxford. He was also Rector of Child Okeford.

Notes

1734 births
Alumni of St John's College, Oxford
Archdeacons of Dorset
1815 deaths